The Council for the Republic, also known as Council for the Catalan Republic, is a private organisation headed by deposed Catalan president Carles Puigdemont, which seeks to organise and promote the Catalan independence movement following the failure of the 2017 Catalan declaration of independence. It also promotes the defence of civil and political rights. The council consists of the president and seven members.

The Council was presented on 30 October 2018 in the Catalan Government Palace, Barcelona, by Carles Puigdemont, Toni Comín, Quim Torra and Pere Aragonès. The event was attended by representatives and deputies, as well as regional ministers and senior government officials, mayors and representatives of civic organisations.

The Council for the Republic was presented on 8 December 2018 at the KVS Flemish Theater in Brussels. The event was attended by Quim Torra, Carles Puigdemont, Toni Comín, Clara Ponsatí, Lluís Puig and Meritxell Serret.

See also
Puigdemont Government

References

External links
 Council for the Republic

Catalan independence movement
Politics of Catalonia